Informatics Education or Informatics Group (can also be called Informatics International College, Informatics College, Informatics Institute or simply Informatics) is an educational institution that caters mainly to students who wants to study Information Technology (IT) related courses. Informatics is also engaged as a franchisee and licensee for both computer and commercial training centers it also facilitates examination, it operates through higher education and corporate training segments.

History 
Informatics was founded in 1983 with the name Bitec Computer Centre Pte Ltd. It commenced operations on August 15, 1983 using the business name Informatics Computer School. On December 13, 1988, the company changed its name to Informatics Holdings Pte Ltd. and to its present name when it was converted to a public limited company on March 19, 1993. It  was listed in Singapore Stock Exchange (SGX) mainboard. Informatics also have affiliations with educational institution in various countries.

In 1998 Informatics buys IT training firm, Informatics Holdings Ltd. has acquired an IT training and education specialist in the United Kingdom through a joint venture.

In May 2004, the company experienced a 70% fall in stock price when it was known that they were taking annual net loss. By June 2004 they have issued shares to an investment unit of Indonesian born tycoon Oei Hong Leong. In July 2004 Informatics made a new one-for-four rights issue deal at 25 cents per share to raise S$19.6 million.

Stock Trading Suspension 
On July 28, 2022 Informatics Education Ltd. (IEL) has been suspended for public trading in Singapore Stock Exchange (SGX) mainboard. It was placed on the watchlist pursuant to Rule 1311(2) (minimum trading price entry criteria) and Rule 1311(1) (financial entry criteria) of the exchange’s listing manual in 2017. The company will remain suspended until the completion of the exit offer to its shareholders, following which it will be delisted.    

After the trading suspension, in October, 2022 Berjaya Corporation subsidiary Berjaya Land Bhd. through its wholly-owned subsidiary, Berjaya Leisure Capital (Cayman) Ltd. (BLCC), intends to make an offer for Informatics Education Ltd. (IEL) shares in connection with the directed delisting of IEL from the Singapore Exchange. BLCC, which owns 119.56 million shares or a 67.4% stake in IEL,  plans to offer S$0.011 in cash for each of the remaining IEL shares, said Berjaya Land in a filing. Furthermore, BLCC also intends to make an offer to acquire the reamaining warrants of IEL at S$0.0001 per warrant.

Corporate affairs

Leadership

Board of directors 
As of 2021, the board of directors of Informatics Education includes:

 Dato’ Sri Robin Tan Yeong Ching (Non-Executive Chairman)
 Yau Su Peng (Executive Director)
 Yeap Beng Swee Philip (Independent Director)
 Professor Lai Kim Fatt (Executive Director)

Subsidiaries 
Informatics Education lists of country of operations and or branches, affiliation, and subsidiaries:

Affiliation in Philippines: 

 Informatics Holdings Phils. Inc. (Informatics Philippines) - is an independently owned and operated local educational institution.

Finances 
For the fiscal (and calendar) year 2022, Informatics Education reported a net income and or loss of SGD $(0.013). The annual revenue was SGD $6.5 million. Below is the lists of revenue, net income, loss and total assets up to the current year period.

References

External links 

 Official Website
 Hong Kong Website

Companies listed on the Singapore Exchange
Information technology schools
Information technology institutes
Educational institutions established in 1983
Universities and colleges in Singapore